USS LST-545 was a United States Navy  in commission from 1944 to 1946

Construction and commissioning
LST-545 was laid down on 13 December 1943 at Evansville, Indiana, by the Missouri Valley Bridge and Iron Company. She was launched on 12 February 1944, sponsored by Mrs. Charles M. Wright, and commissioned on 23 March 1944.

Service history
LST-545 saw no combat action during World War II. Following the war, she performed occupation duty in the Far East until early December 1945. She then returned to the United States.

Decommissioning and disposal
LST-545 was decommissioned on 29 August 1946.  She was sunk as a target on 12 May 1948 at Enewetak Atoll in the Operation Sandstone atomic bomb test series, by either the Yoke or Zebra detonations or the two of them in combination. She was stricken from the Navy List on 28 May 1948.

References
 

 

LST-542-class tank landing ships
World War II amphibious warfare vessels of the United States
Ships built in Evansville, Indiana
1944 ships
Ships sunk as targets
Shipwrecks in the Pacific Ocean
Ships involved in Operation Crossroads
Maritime incidents in 1946
Maritime incidents in 1948